Mugham triads — performers of a classic mugham consists who play the national musical instruments of Azerbaijan: tar, kamancheh and daf (tambourine);

Structure 
The vocal instruments which are performed by the mugham triads are called the Mugham desgah. Deshgah means mugham's sophistication, its sequence, all sections and parts, as well as the sequence of tasnif and color. The sections included in the Mugham composition are composed of improvised receptive styled vocal tunes that determine the musical-poetic content of the work. They are replaced by song and dance episodes with a precise rhythm. Song episodes are called “tasnif” and dance is called “color”.

In the early stage the sazende group was used in the triads: tar, kamancheh and balaban (balm), tasnif and color were used in the circle and naqareh. After reconstruction of the tar by the famous tar player Sadigjan, there is no need to use naqareh, which is replaced by the fine-tune daf. Thus, this group consists of only 3 people. This group includes the tarzen, kamancheh player and khanende that have been functioning since the second half of the 19th century. They play an important role in the development of Azerbaijani folk music and the creation of mugham performing school.

The main performer of the trio group is the singer – khanende who performs with daf. He builds a composition based on his own taste and ability. More precisely, khanende decides which sections to include in which subdivisions, also to incorporate the content, color, or tasnif. The Khanende brings the daf closer to the pile as he sings mugham, and ensures that his voice is focused on the listeners. During the performance of tasnif and color, he accompanies his partners and himself.

The second participant of the trio group is the tarzen and the musical instrument is tar. While the knanende is singing, he accompanies him with organ, plays the interactive solo mugham, and modulates the new episodes. The execution of the desgah is a kind of dialogue with the tarzen. Firstly, the tar plays some parts instrumentally and then replaces its place with khanende. Tarzen is the only soloist in the instrumental plays which switch with mugham sections. The tarzen should have the ensemble sense and must not only accompany the khanande but also should know when to give him to have a breath and feel his individual opportunities in a sensitive way.

The tarzen should have the ensemble sense and must not only accompany the khanande but also should know when he let the khanande pause and should feel his individual opportunities in a sensitive way.

The last part of the group - kamancheh’s function (bowed string instrument) is limited. At the same time, the kamancheh player accompanying the khanende and tarzen also helps to express the style of expression of mugham. Additionally, imitation of the tar with the khanende, the kamancheh with the tar, create a complex expression in the musical language called double imitation. But the kamancheh is not an accomplice only. After the dramatic episodes of the khanende in the lyrical, mournful episodes of mugham, the kamancheh's solos are expressive.

Use of musical instruments

Daf 
Daf is a punched instrument. The daf is a round wood ring, one side is covered with fish skin. Small circular rings are mounted inside a circular, wide 60–75 mm and 350–450 mm in diameter, and they snooze while performance. Mugham is widely used in performances. It's a kind of attribute of khanende. Thus, the khanende takes part in the performance of the full-length rhythmic music episodes of triads with playing in daf. Therefore, the daf has become a kind of khanende's attribute.

Tar 
Tar is a string musical instrument played with mizrab. The Azerbaijani tar is used in the mugham triads  has its own structure, design and artistic and technical capabilities.

Kamancheh 
Kamancheh is the only string musical instrument among Azerbaijani folk instruments. It is one of the oldest musical instruments in Azerbaijan. It is depicted in Nizami Ganjavi's poem "Khosrov and Shirin" and depicted in Tabriz miniature paintings (Aghamirek Isfahani, Mir Seyid Ali). Kamancheh is mainly made of walnut.

In some films, mugham triads have been mentioned. For example, in the 1956 Azerbaijani film, "O olmasın, bu olsun" (It Does not matter) it was a trio of Khan Shushinski, Bahram Mansurov and Talat Bakikhanov.

On February 17, 2014, the picture of the mugham triads is used on the Azerbaijani philately product released by Azermarka. The part of the picture with daf is separately released as a stamp.

The musical instruments of the mugham triads were depicted on 1 manat of Azerbaijan issued by the Central Bank of Azerbaijan in 2005 and 2009 and 1 coin of Azerbaijan issued in 2006.

See also 
Music of Azerbaijan

References 

Azerbaijani music
Azerbaijani musicians
Azerbaijani musical groups